Tolna variegata is a species of moth of the family Noctuidae first described by George Hampson in 1905. It is found in South Africa.

References

Endemic moths of South Africa
Catocalinae